Out of This World may refer to:

Film and television 
Out of This World (1945 film), an American romantic comedy directed by Hall Walker
Out of This World, a 1954 short film featured in season 6 of Mystery Science Theater 3000
Out of This World, a 2004 Japanese film directed by Junji Sakamoto
The Space Between Us (film) (working title Out of This World), an American film directed by Peter Chelsom
Out of This World (American TV series), a 1987–1991 sitcom
Out of This World (British TV series), a 1962 science fiction anthology series
"Out of This World" (The Brady Bunch), a 1974 TV episode

Music

Albums 
Out of This World (Europe album), 1988
Out of This World (Maureen McGovern album), 1996
Out of This World (Pepper Adams Donald Byrd Quintet album), 1961
Out of This World (Radiophonic album), a collection of library recordings from the BBC Radiophonic Workshop, 1976
Out of This World (Shakatak album), 1983
Out of This World (Teddy Edwards album), 1981
Out of This World (The Three Sounds album), 1966
Out of This World (Walter Benton album), 1960
Out of This World, by Nichelle Nichols, 1991
Outta This World, by JLS, 2010

Songs 
"Out of This World" (Johnny Mercer song), written by  Harold Arlen and Mercer, 1944; recorded by numerous artists
"Out of This World", by Black Flag from In My Head, 1985
"Out of This World", by Bush from Golden State, 2001
"Out of This World", by the Chiffons, 1966
"Out of This World", by the Cure from Bloodflowers, 2000
"Out of This World", by the Grass Roots from Leaving It All Behind, 1969
"Out of This World", by Jonas Brothers from Jonas Brothers, 2007
"Out of This World", by Marillion from Afraid of Sunlight, 1995
"Out of This World", by Melanie C and Jools Holland, 2011
"Out of This World", by Tim Finn from The Conversation, 2008

Literature 
Out of This World (Leinster book), a 1958 science fiction collection by Murray Leinster
Out of This World (Swift novel), a 1988 novel by Graham Swift
Out of This World (Watt-Evans novel), a 1993 fantasy novel by Lawrence Watt-Evans
Out of This World, a 1986–1989 young adult science fiction series by Marilyn Kaye
Out of This World, a 1949 novel by Neville Lancelot Goddard
Out of This World, a fantasy novel by Ali Sparkes
Out of This World, a 1950 book by Lowell Thomas Jr.
"Out of This World", a 1964 short story by Alfred Bester

Other uses
Out of This World (card trick), a card trick created by Paul Curry in 1942
Out of This World (musical), a 1950 musical by Cole Porter and Dwight Taylor
Out of This World (video game), or Another World, a 1991 action-adventure game